Xatax is a scrolling shooter developed by Pixel Painters for DOS and released as shareware in 1994.

Plot
It is the 25th century and after centuries of peace a disarmed humanity is under attack by an alien force known as the "Xatax", which destroys planets by consuming all life on them and leaving only barren wasteland. The Xatax grows stronger with each world it destroys by assimilating the living creatures it consumes into itself.

An ancient starfighter has been taken from the Interguild Museum located on Terra and restored to combat condition. It must now destroy the Xatax.

Gameplay
The game is a horizontally scrolling shooter. The player's ship must defeat waves of attacking aliens and defensive turrets over three levels before challenging the Xatax itself. Dead aliens drop power-up capsules which must be collected if the player is to survive to the end of the mission.

References

External links

DOS games
DOS-only games
1994 video games
Horizontally scrolling shooters
Video games developed in the United States